The Age of Atlantic is the second in a series of rock music samplers released by the Atlantic label in the UK. The compilation is credited to Janet Martin. Issued at a budget price of UK £0.99, the album was for many an inexpensive introduction to new rock acts, and was one of the earliest samplers of "progressive" or "underground" music.

The gatefold's exterior was modelled in plasticine and, on its front, showed the logos or punning representations of the featured bands, whose album covers were depicted in the interior. The rear features the track listing scratched into a flattened layer of plasticine. The design is credited to Hamish & Gustav.

Track listing

Side One
 "Comin' Home" (Bramlett/Clapton) - Delaney & Bonnie (with Eric Clapton)
 "Tonight" (MC5) - MC5
 "Black Hearted Woman" (Allman) - Allman Brothers Band
 "Survival" (Anderson) - Yes
 "I'm a Good Woman" (Ozen) - Cold Blood
 "Whole Lotta Love" (Page/Plant/Jones/Bonham) - Led Zeppelin

Side Two
 "Termination" (Brann/Dorman) - Iron Butterfly
 "The Last Time" (Jagger/Richards) - Dada
 "Communication Breakdown" (Page/Plant/Jones/Bonham) - Led Zeppelin
 "Wash Mama Wash" (Rebennack) - Dr John
 "Need Love" (Stein/Bogert/Martell/Appice) - Vanilla Fudge
 "Broken Arrow" (Young) - Buffalo Springfield

References
* Progressive Rock site

Sampler albums
1970 compilation albums
Rock compilation albums
Atlantic Records compilation albums